Shaw Stadium is a stadium in East Cleveland, Ohio, United States, mainly used for high school football. The stadium was built in 1923 and is home to the Shaw High School Cardinals football team and marching band.

In 1938, the Cleveland Rams of the National Football League (NFL) played three of their four home games at Shaw, winning two and losing one. The Rams earned their first home NFL victory in franchise history with a defeat of the Detroit Lions, followed by a win over the Chicago Bears. 

Both Case Institute of Technology and Western Reserve University, which later merged to create Case Western Reserve University, used Shaw Stadium at various times for their home football field. The Case Tech Rough Riders used Shaw for home football games from 1939 to 1952. Case had previously played at Shaw in the 1920s for games against rival Western Reserve, who were known as the Pioneers at the time, playing there in 1923, 1925, and 1926. Western Reserve University, later known as the Western Reserve Red Cats, held occasional games at Shaw, but used it as their home field for the 1942, 1946, and 1950 seasons.

References

Defunct National Football League venues
East Cleveland, Ohio
Cleveland Rams stadiums
Case Western Spartans football
High school football venues in Ohio
Buildings and structures in Cuyahoga County, Ohio
1923 establishments in Ohio
Sports venues completed in 1923
Defunct college football venues